Hilding may refer to:

Given name
Hilding Ekelund (1893–1984), Finnish architect
Hilding Ekman (1893–1966), Swedish runner
Hilding Faxén (1892–1970), Swedish physicist
Hilding Gavle (1901–1969), Swedish actor
Hilding Hagberg (1899–1993), Swedish communist politician
Hilding Hallnäs (1903–1984), Swedish composer
Hilding Kring (1899–1971), Swedish Army lieutenant general
Hilding Köhler (1888–1982), Swedish meteorologist
Hilding Rosenberg (1892–1985), Swedish modernist composer
Hilding Alfred Swanson (1885-1964), American lawyer and politician

Surname
Knud Hilding (1921–1975), Danish actor

Hilding
Scandinavian masculine given names
Swedish masculine given names